Tosin Joseph Ogunode (born 2 March 1994) is a Nigerian-born track and field sprinter who competes internationally for Qatar.

He is the younger brother of Femi Ogunode, another Nigerian-turned-Qatari sprinter who won two golds at the 2010 Asian Games. Tosin Ogunode made his debut at the start of the 2014 season and promptly set an Asian indoor record of 6.50 seconds for the 60 metres event at the Northern Arizona University indoor facility in the United States. This improved Talal Mansour's twenty-year-old record for the distance. This placed him top of the world rankings for a short period. His name is the shortened form of "Oluwatosin" meaning "God is worthy to be worshiped" in Yoruba

References

External links

Living people
1994 births
Qatari male sprinters
Nigerian male sprinters
Nigerian emigrants to Qatar
Naturalised citizens of Qatar
Qatari people of Nigerian descent
Qatari people of Yoruba descent
Yoruba sportspeople
Asian Games medalists in athletics (track and field)
Athletes (track and field) at the 2018 Asian Games
Asian Games silver medalists for Qatar
Medalists at the 2018 Asian Games